NIGC may refer to:

National Iranian Gas Company
National Indian Gaming Commission in the United States